Ikermiorsuaq Island (old spelling: Ikermiorssuaq) is an uninhabited island in Avannaata municipality in northwestern Greenland.

Geography 
Ikermiorsuaq Island is located in the northern part of Upernavik Archipelago, in the center of Sugar Loaf Bay, an indentation of Baffin Bay, halfway between a chain of small islands off the southern coast of Nuussuaq Peninsula in the northwest, and Nasaussaq Island in the southeast, at the mouth of Nasaussap Saqqaa fjord.

See also
List of islands of Greenland

References

External links
1:1,000,000 scale Operational Navigation Chart, Sheet B-8

Uninhabited islands of Greenland
Sugar Loaf Bay
Islands of the Upernavik Archipelago